The Ministry of Industries is a cabinet ministry of the Government of Sri Lanka responsible for industry and commerce. The ministry is responsible for formulating and implementing national policy on industry and commerce and other subjects which come under its purview. The current Minister of Industries is Ramesh Pathirana. The ministry's secretary is Chinthaka S. Lokuhetty.

The biggest government controlled wholesale and retail chain known as the Lanka Sathosa falls under this ministry. The acronym SA-THO-SA is believed to be derived from the Sinhalese name  "SAmoopakaara THOgaveladhaam SAngsthava", i.e., Cooperative Wholesale Establishment.

Ministers

Secretaries

References

External links
 

Industries
 
Sri Lanka
Industries
Industry in Sri Lanka